Whitwell is a village and civil parish in the county of Rutland in the East Midlands of England. The population at the 2001 census was 41. At the 2011 census the population remained less than 100 and was included together with the neighbouring parish of Exton.

It is located on the A606, about four miles (6 km) east of Oakham, on the north shore of Rutland Water with car parking off Bull Brig Lane.  Whitwell Harbour is a popular sailing and water sports area and a pleasure boat known as the Rutland Belle operates from the harbour. Whitwell is one of the smallest villages in Rutland; it only has 19 houses, plus The Noel pub, the name of which comes from the Earls of Gainsborough, who were landholders in the area.

The village's name means 'spring/stream which is white', probably meaning it was infertile.

Whitwell claims to be twinned with Paris, France. In 1980, regulars from the pub, the Noel Arms wrote to the then Mayor of Paris, Jacques Chirac proposing the link and with a tight deadline for a response. As no answer arrived from the Mayor's office by the set date, the village unilaterally declared itself to be twinned and erected road signs to that effect. The original wooden signs were later replaced in metal by Rutland County Council.

References

External links

 A 1980 regional news report from ATV on the twinning celebrations from the Media Archive for Central England

Villages in Rutland
Civil parishes in Rutland